The M59/M85 is a Yugoslav Combat helmet. They were produced in 1958/59 and 1985 as the names suggest. They were commonly used in the Yugoslav Wars. Many Serbian factions used both models from 1991-2000.

Specifications

M59 

The helmet's shape was inspired by the Spanish M34 helmet, sharing very similar profiles, with cut down edges. The liner is a copy of the American M1 helmet's webbing system. The webbing is attached to the helmet with rectangular retention washers. The original models had red stars stenciled on them. Repurposed M59 helmets often incorporated Yugoslavian decals/stickers in order to match the current belligerent.

M85 
The M85 Is a modernization of the M59 design, trimming down the rear of the helmet's skirt to make it more comfortable to lie prone, and utilizes a slightly modified liner using clips to keep the leather sweatband in place. In 1989, a Kevlar version of the M85 was introduced (designated as M89). The shape of these helmets is identical to the steel M85, though much thicker and with external rivets to mount the lining. They would be issued alongside M59s and M85s until they were able to be mass produced.

References

External links
 Yugoslavia M59/85 at brendonshelmets.weebly.com

Combat helmets of Yugoslavia
Military equipment introduced in the 1950s